Saltomay refer to:

Places

Settlements
 Salto, Buenos Aires, Argentina
 Salto Partido, a provincial subdivision
 Salto, São Paulo, Brazil
 Salto, Cape Verde
 Salto, Cidra, Puerto Rico
 Salto, San Sebastián, Puerto Rico
 Salto, Portugal, a parish in the municipality of Montalegre
 Salto, Uruguay
 Salto Department
 Roman Catholic Diocese of Salto, Uruguay

Rivers and lakes
 Lago del Salto, a lake in Lazio, Italy
 Salto River (Paraíba), Brazil
 Salto River (Costa Rica)

People
 Álvaro Salto (born 1974), Spanish golfer
 Kasper Salto (born 1967), Danish industrial designer

Other uses
 Salto (film), a 1965 Polish drame
 Salto, a somersault in gymnastics 
 Salto F.C., a Uruguayan football club
 Start + Flug H-101 Salto, an aerobatic glider
 reuSable strAtegic space Launcher Technologies & Operations, a program of the European Commission to develop a new reusable rocket
 Salto (streaming service), a streaming service in France by France Télévisions, the TF1 Group and the Groupe M6

See also

 Do Salto River (disambiguation)
 El Salto (disambiguation)
 Saltos, a barrio in Puerto Rico
 Siege of Salto, in the Uruguayan War, 1864